"Good Time Baby" is a song released in January 1961 by Bobby Rydell. The song spent 11 weeks on the Billboard Hot 100 chart, peaking at No. 11, while reaching No. 6 in Australia, No. 6 on Canada's CHUM Hit Parade, No. 18 in the Netherlands, and No. 42 in the United Kingdom's Record Retailer chart.

The song was ranked No. 88 on Billboards end of year "Hot 100 for 1961 - Top Sides of the Year" and No. 93 on Cash Boxs "Top 100 Chart Hits of 1961".

Chart performance

References

1960 songs
1961 singles
Bobby Rydell songs
Cameo Records singles
Songs written by Dave Appell
Songs written by Bernie Lowe
Songs with lyrics by Kal Mann